Kirsten Marise Davidson is an Australian model and beauty queen who won the Miss International pageant in 1992, held in Nagasaki, Japan.

She is the third Australian to win the pageant. She was preceded and succeeded as winner by the Polish delegates.

References

Miss International winners
Living people
Year of birth missing (living people)
Australian beauty pageant winners
Miss International 1992 delegates